Brisbane Airport  is the primary international airport serving Brisbane and South East Queensland. The airport services 31 airlines flying to 50 domestic and 29 international destinations, in total amounting to more than 22.7 million passengers who travelled through the airport in 2016. In 2016, an OAG report named Brisbane airport as the fifth-best performing large-sized airport in the world for on-time performance with 86.71% of arrivals and departures occurring within 15 minutes of their scheduled times, slipping from 88.31% the year before.

Brisbane Airport is a major hub for both Virgin Australia and Qantas, and a secondary hub for Qantas' low cost subsidiary Jetstar. Brisbane has the third highest number of domestic connections in Australia following Sydney and Melbourne. It is also home to Qantas' A330 and B737 heavy maintenance facilities. Virgin Australia has a smaller maintenance facility at the airport, where line-maintenance on the airline's 737 fleet is performed. Other airlines, namely QantasLink, and Alliance Airlines also conduct maintenance at their respective facilities at the airport. The airport has international and domestic passenger terminals, a cargo terminal, a general aviation terminal and apron as well as two runways. JETGO Australia also operated from Brisbane Airport until its demise in 2018.

The Royal Flying Doctor Service has one of its nine Queensland bases at Brisbane Airport.

On 30 March 2020, runway 14/32 was decommissioned early as part of Brisbane's new runway 'Operational Readiness & Testing' phase so that the newly decommissioned cross runway could be used for aircraft parking.

History

Eagle Farm Airport

Although Qantas started operations there in 1926, most of the flights in Brisbane operated at the Archerfield Airport, which contained a superior landing surface. While in operation, Charles Kingsford Smith landed at Eagle Farm on 9 June 1928, after completing the first trans-pacific flight in his Fokker F.VII, the Southern Cross. There is now a museum containing the original aircraft, along with a memorial located within the Brisbane Airport precinct.

During the Second World War, Brisbane was the headquarters of the Supreme Commander of Allied forces in the South West Pacific Area, General Douglas MacArthur. The United States Armed Forces upgraded the airfield (Eagle Farm Airport) to cater for military flights, bringing it to such a standard that it became the main civilian airport for the city.

By the 1960s, the facilities at Eagle Farm Airport were inadequate for a city of Brisbane's size and anticipated growth. Many long-haul international services to Asia were required to make an en route stop (i.e. Darwin), disadvantaging the city to lure prospective carriers and business opportunities.

Some of the infrastructure at Eagle Farm Airport was incorporated into today's Brisbane Airport. For example, the north-east end of the main runway (04/22) survives as taxiway Papa of the present airport, while the Eagle Farm international terminal is now the Brisbane Airport cargo terminal. The final flight from the Eagle Farm Airport departed on March 20, 1988.

1988 opening
The Federal Government announced the construction of Brisbane Airport to be built immediately north east of Eagle Farm Airport. Construction commenced in June 1980. The new airport was built by Leighton Contractors at a cost of AU$400 million and opened on March 19, 1988, with a new domestic terminal and two runways. The opening was hosted by Prime Minister Bob Hawke. The new airport was built on the former Brisbane residential suburb of Cribb Island that was demolished to make way for the airport. Large amounts of sand were pumped from nearby Moreton Bay to raise the swamp land above the tidal range.

In September 1995 the international terminal was inaugurated by Prime Minister Paul Keating, and it has been expanded since that time.

Privatisation
In 1997, as part of the privatisation of numerous Australian airports, the airport was acquired for $1.4 billion from the Federal Airports Corporation by Brisbane Airport Corporation (BAC) under a 50-year lease (with an option to renew for a further 49 years). Since that time, BAC has assumed ultimate responsibility for the operations of Brisbane Airport including all airport infrastructure investment with no government funding. BAC's shareholders are major Australian and international organisations and significant institutional investors, including Queensland Investment Corporation, Amsterdam Airport Schiphol, Colonial First State and IFM Investors. Approximately 80 percent of BAC shareholders are Australians with their savings invested in superannuation and other funds. Brisbane Airport is categorised as a Leased Federal Airport.

In 2020, construction of a new runway was completed. Its first flight was operated by Virgin Australia, flight VA781 to Cairns, on 12 July 2020.

Terminals

Brisbane Airport has two passenger terminals.

International terminal

The international terminal was built in 1995 and has 14 bays with aerobridges, four of these are capable of handling A380s. There are also four layover bays. The terminal has four levels: level 1 houses most airline offices and baggage handlers, level 2 handles arrivals, level 3 houses the departure lounge (airside) and other offices (landside), and level 4 houses departure check-in.

The airport contains an Emirates lounge, the first outside Dubai that has direct access to the A380 aerobridges, and also has Air New Zealand, Qantas, Singapore Airlines, Swissport and Plaza Premium lounges.

There is also a five-storey long term carpark and a smaller short term carpark in close proximity to the terminal.

The international terminal redevelopment began in February 2014. The A$45 million redevelopment is designed by Brisbane architectural practices Richards and Spence and Arkhefield. Queensland artists, Sebastian Moody and Mirdidingkingathi Juwarnda Sally Gabori, were commissioned for the artworks.

The international terminal at Brisbane Airport was the first airport in the world to roll out a Bitcoin and other crypto-currency related token payment service  that majority of the stores within the terminal have taken part in.

Domestic terminal

Brisbane Airport's domestic terminal is a two-storey curved building with three complete satellite arms extending beyond the building providing additional passenger lounge and gate facilities for airlines.

The domestic terminal has three distinct areas serving Qantas and QantasLink at the northern end of the building and Virgin Australia at the southern end of the building with other carriers such as Jetstar located in the central area of the terminal.

The Qantas concourse has nine bays served by aerobridges including one served by a dual bridge. It has three lounges – the Qantas Club, Business Class and Chairman's Lounge. Virgin Australia occupies what was the former Ansett Australia end of the terminal. Its concourse has 11 parking bays, nine of which are served by aerobridges including two served by a dual bridge. It has one lounge – the Virgin Australia Lounge which is located in the former Golden Wing Club opposite Gate 41.

Remote bays are located to the north and south of the building (serving non-jet aircraft), and in the central area (serving jet aircraft).

On 27 February 2014, Qantas announced it had disposed of its long-term lease (signed in 1987) at the domestic terminal which was due to expire on 30 December 2018. Under the new arrangements, Qantas retains exclusive use and operational control over much of the northern end of the terminal until the end of 2018 while securing rights to key infrastructure beyond this period.

In addition, BAC plans to make a significant investment in upgrading and improving facilities and services within the terminal, such as lounges and will assume control of the retail space of this part of the terminal.

AVCAIR FBO & VIP Lounge and Brisbane Jet Base
Brisbane has two FBO Lounge and Operation Facilities, located on the North Apron (Brisbane Jet Base) and South Logistics Apron (AVCAIR FBO) of Brisbane Airport. The AVCAIR facility handles VIP and FIFO (fly-in fly-out) movements including Ad hoc Military, Medical and Charter flights and offers direct airside access for VIP movements.

Airlines and destinations

Passenger

Cargo

Other tennants
There are several operators of emergency medical retrieval and rescue services based at the airport, including LifeFlight Australia, the Royal Flying Doctor Service and AVCAIR.

Ground transport

Motorised transport
Brisbane Airport has 4 car-parks, all operating 24 hours a day, 7 days a week. There are 2 multi-level undercover car parks, the international, providing short and long term services, and the domestic also provides long and short term parking. Qantas and Virgin Australia also offer Valet Parking at the domestic terminal only. Total car spaces number 9,000.

Rail

The airport has two railway stations as part of a privately owned airport rail line. The international terminal railway station is elevated and located next to the international terminal, as is the domestic railway station. Both stations are privately owned and operated by the Airtrain Citylink consortium. As a result, fares are more expensive than a regular suburban ticket however less than half the taxi fare. The AirtrainCitylink travels via the Queensland Rail City network to Fortitude Valley and the Brisbane CBD, with most trains continuing to the Gold Coast via South Bank.

Inter-terminal bus
There is an inter-terminal bus connecting the two terminals and the nearby Skygate shopping precinct, DFO and adjacent Novotel Brisbane Airport hotel.

Development projects

New parallel runway
On 18 September 2007, the federal government granted approval for the construction of a new parallel runway. The long construction period was due to the settling period of the 13 million cubic metres of sand fill dredged from Moreton Bay. In early December 2014 the delivery of 11 million cubic metres of sand to the site was completed. In 2019, asphalting of the second runway had begun and was completed by late 2019, while mid February 2020 saw the start of the line-marking of the runway. The runway was completed on 30 April 2020 after over eight years of construction at a cost of over $1 billion. It opened officially on Sunday, 12 July 2020, and a Virgin Australia flight to Cairns was the first to take off from the new runway.

Road infrastructure

To help relieve congestion between Brisbane and the airport, the Queensland Government, Brisbane City Council, and a Thiess/John Holland Group/Macquarie Bank consortium (BrisConnections) built the Airport Link project. It was completed in mid-2012.

The Northern Access Road project, completed in December 2009, significantly reduces traffic congestion on Airport Drive.

Cycling Network
Brisbane Airport has cycling and pedestrian connections connecting to the Moreton Bay Bikeway network.

Brisbane Centre
The Brisbane FIR consists of New South Wales north of Sydney, all of Queensland, most of the Northern Territory and the northern half of Western Australia. It also contains the Australian Tasman Sea airspace. Brisbane Centre is located adjacent to Brisbane Tower at Brisbane Airport. It also contains Brisbane Approach.

Due to the nature of the airspace it controls, most international flights in and out of Australia (except Indian Ocean flights) come under the Brisbane FIR's jurisdiction, as well as domestic flights operating to and from airports within the zone. From Brisbane Centre, Airservices Australia manages the airspace over the northern half of Australia, representing 5 per cent of the world's total airspace. As only two of eight capitals are located in the Brisbane FIR, it handles a lesser volume of traffic than Melbourne Centre. However, Sydney is on the border of the two FIRs, and thus Brisbane Centre has control of flights arriving or departing in Sydney from the North.

Traffic and statistics
Brisbane Airport's annual passenger numbers were 23.1 million in 2017 and is expected to grow to around 50 million by 2035

Awards
Brisbane Airport has won a number of awards; including being rated as Australia's No. 1 airport for quality of service 10 years in a row (2005–2014 inclusive) in a survey by the Australian Competition and Consumer Commission, and being ranked as 3rd Best Airport in the world (for airports servicing between 20 and 30 million passengers per year). In 2015, it was reported as the fourth-best medium-sized airport for on-time arrivals and departures. The international terminal won the Queensland architecture award. In 2005 Brisbane Airport was awarded the IATA Eagle Award, the second of only two Australian airports to receive such an award.

Accidents and incidents 
 On 15 February 2012, a Toll Aviation Fairchild Metro III freighter came to rest on its fuselage about 2.30 am. Neither of the two pilots was injured. The landing gear on the light plane failed to go down during testing after maintenance.
 On 18 July 2018, a Malaysian Airlines Airbus A330 took off from Brisbane with pitot tube covers still in place, resulting in unreliable airspeed indications and the aircraft diverting back to Brisbane. Airport ground staff had placed covers on the pitot tubes to prevent mud wasps nesting in them (a common hazard at Brisbane Airport), and the pilots, engineers and ground staff failed to check the covers were removed prior to departure.
 On 1 July 2022, an Emirates A380 performing flight 430 from Dubai landed at Brisbane Airport with a hole on the left side of its fuselage. A missing bolt and cap was found on the aircraft's nose landing gear after it parked. Damage allegedly occurred on takeoff and the pilots reported a blown tire before landing, but investigation is ongoing.

Notable people 
 Julieanne Alroe, chief executive officer of Brisbane Airport Corporation July 2009 – June 2018

See also
 Brisbane Airport (suburb) a suburb of Brisbane
 List of airports in Queensland
 Transport in Australia
 United States Army Air Forces in Australia (World War II)

References

External links

Brisbane Airport official website
Brisbane Airport Retail Management Division
Review of the international terminal on LateDeparture.com

Airports in Queensland
 
1988 establishments in Australia
Airports established in 1988
Airfields of the United States Army Air Forces in Australia
Transport in Brisbane
International airports in Australia